Tezpur Airport , also known as Salonibari Air Force Station, is a domestic airport and an Indian Air Force Station serving Tezpur, Assam, India.

The airport covers an area of 22 acres, with the passenger terminal. The apron can accommodate one Airbus A320 and two ATR-72 aircraft.

History
During World War II, the Royal Indian Air Force built the runway at Tezpur in 1942. It was used by the United States Army Air Forces Tenth Air Force as a B-24 Liberator heavy bomber base by the 7th Bombardment Group. After the war, it was converted into an air force base in 1959. The strategic location of the base has contributed to its importance. A variety of aircraft have operated from this location including de Havilland Vampire, Dassault Ouragan and MiG-21.

Indian Air Force's No. 2 Squadron "Winged Arrows" and No. 106 Squadron "Lynx" operate Sukhoi Su-30MKI from here.

Airlines and destinations

Statistics

References

External links
 Tezpur Airport at the AAI
 

Indian Air Force bases
Transport in Tezpur
Airfields of the United States Army Air Forces in British India
Airports in Assam
Airports established in 1942
1942 establishments in India
20th-century architecture in India